Kalisham castle is a historical castle located in Rudbar County in Gilan Province, The longevity of this fortress dates back to the Iron Age.

References 

Castles in Iran
Castles of the Nizari Ismaili state